A monkey jacket is a waist length jacket tapering at the back to a point. Use of the term has been dated to the 1850s onwards.

As early as the 1790s sailors wore a broad collar, double-breasted, waist length roundabout style jacket, aka mustering jacket, that later became known as a "monkey jacket".

This roundabout style jacket was nicknamed "monkey jacket" after the monkeys that accompanied organ grinders. These street organ monkeys were trained to do tricks and collect coins as the grinder played music.  The jacket was not named because sailors climbed the rigging of sailing ships like monkeys.

The term is also used in the United Kingdom to describe a type of jacket worn in Mod subculture.

References

Other sources 

 
 

Jackets
Sailors